Phenacogrammus stigmatura is a species of fish in the African tetra family. It is found in Cameroon Africa.

References

Paugy, D., 1984. Characidae. p. 140-183. In J. Daget, J.-P. Gosse and D.F.E. Thys van den Audenaerde (eds.) Check-list of the freshwater fishes of Africa (CLOFFA). ORSTOM, Paris and MRAC, Tervuren. Vol. 1.

Alestidae
Freshwater fish of Africa
Taxa named by Henry Weed Fowler
Fish described in 1936